Peter Hackenberg (born 6 February 1989) is a German former footballer who played as centre-back.

References

Living people
1989 births
German footballers
Association football central defenders
FC Energie Cottbus II players
FC Energie Cottbus players
SV Wacker Burghausen players
1. FC Magdeburg players
Alemannia Aachen players
K.A.S. Eupen players
Belgian Pro League players
Challenger Pro League players
3. Liga players
Regionalliga players
People from Eutin
Footballers from Schleswig-Holstein